Carlyle Lake is a  reservoir largely located in Clinton County, Illinois, with smaller portions of the lake within Bond and Fayette counties. It is the largest man-made lake in Illinois, and the largest lake wholly contained within the state.

History
With the frequent flooding of the Kaskaskia River, citizens of Clinton County formed an organization in 1933 to discuss the Kaskaskia River Valley Project. This group made efforts to study all of the physical, economic, and social aspects of the Kaskaskia River throughout the state of Illinois. After completing this report the possibilities of Carlyle Lake were discussed. In 1938, Congress approved the Flood Control Act of June 28, 1938, which authorized a major reservoir at Carlyle, levees downstream, and a plan for the development of the Kaskaskia Basin, but World War II put a temporary halt to the construction of the Carlyle reservoir.

Shortly after settling in Carlyle, Eldon E. Hazlet became interested in the Kaskaskia River and points along the banks. Full of enthusiasm, Hazlet formed the Kaskaskia Valley Association (KVA) to sell the Kaskaskia River Project to the general public. In 1957, the U.S. Army Corps of Engineers completed a comprehensive plan for the Kaskaskia River Project and the Carlyle and Shelbyville Reservoir Projects were authorized in Congress by the Flood Control Act of July 3, 1958.

Construction of Carlyle Lake began October 18, 1958. The government purchased 25,000 acres for the lake, in addition to land surrounding the lake for flowage easement. Homesteads were moved, along with country roads and the Chicago, Burlington and Quincy Railroad. Tracks containing five bridges span the water between Keyesport and Boulder, dividing the upper and lower parts of the lake. The rights to 69 oil wells were purchased, and the wells were plugged to prevent pollution in the lake. Over 600 burial sites had to be moved from seven cemeteries. Other shoreline cemeteries had to be moved to higher ground.

The Carlyle Lake project was completed in April 1967 and the Carlyle Lake Dam was dedicated on June 3, 1967. The damming of the Kaskaskia River at Carlyle is 107 miles from the mouth of the river and creates the largest man-made lake in Illinois.

Today
Located around the lake are the Dam West, Dam East, McNair, Coles Creek, Boulder and Keyesport Recreation Areas operated by the U.S. Army Corps of Engineers. The Illinois Department of Natural Resources operates the Eldon Hazlet State Park and the Carlyle Lake Wildlife Management Area. Carlyle Lake has five developed campgrounds with more than 300 campsites. The lake also has five beaches, numerous boat ramps, and access areas for outdoor recreational enthusiasts to enjoy.

Carlyle Lake is a multi purpose lake that was built for the primary purpose of flood risk management. The lake also supports commercial navigation, water supply, water quality, fish and wildlife conservation, and recreational swimming.

Carlyle Lake is used by many for boating, particularly sailing.  Many use the lake to catch channel catfish, flatheads, largemouth bass, white bass, crappie, and bluegill.

The lake is separated into two unequal parts by a 3.5-mile-long (6 km) railroad embankment, and five bridges, carrying the tracks of the Burlington Northern Santa Fe.

The lake is the subject of Sufjan Stevens' song, "Carlyle Lake" on The Avalanche: Outtakes and Extras from the Illinois Album.

See also
Carlyle Lake Resort, Saskatchewan

External links
 
 Carlyle Lake - U.S. Army Corps of Engineers
 History
    (Source of depths and shoreline)

Dams completed in 1966
Dams in Illinois
Bodies of water of Bond County, Illinois
Bodies of water of Clinton County, Illinois
Bodies of water of Fayette County, Illinois
Protected areas of Bond County, Illinois
Protected areas of Clinton County, Illinois
Protected areas of Fayette County, Illinois
Reservoirs in Illinois
United States Army Corps of Engineers dams
1967 establishments in Illinois